James Wray Williams (October 8, 1792 – December 2, 1842) was a U.S. Representative from Maryland. He served as a member of the Maryland House of Delegates from 1837 to 1839 and served as speaker of the Maryland House of Delegates in 1839.

Early life
James Wray Williams was born on October 8, 1792. He completed preparatory studies.

Career
Williams served as a member of the Maryland House of Delegates, representing Harford County, from 1837 to 1839. He served as speaker in 1839.

Williams was elected as a Democrat to the 27th Congress and served from March 4, 1841, until his death.

Personal life
Williams died on December 2, 1842, at his home at the Prieshford farm, Deer Creek, Maryland. He was interred in the family cemetery on Prieshford farm.

See also
List of United States Congress members who died in office (1790–1899)

References

1792 births
1842 deaths
Speakers of the Maryland House of Delegates
Democratic Party members of the United States House of Representatives from Maryland
19th-century American politicians